The Hawaiian freshwater goby, or ‘O‘opu (Lentipes concolor) (‘o‘opu ‘alamo‘o or ‘o‘opu hi‘u koleis), is a species of goby endemic to Hawaii, where it occurs in mountain streams.

This species is important to the native people as a food fish. In Ancient Hawaiʻi, this species, and others such as mullet and Kuhlia sandvicensis, were cultivated in a form of freshwater aquaponics or aquatic polyculture. In this system of farming, the taro in the upland paddies (taro being the primary staple in Ancient Hawaiʻi) was aided by the fish such as the Hawaiʻian freshwater goby, through these fish pruning the leaves and eating the pests, thus leading to a symbiotic system of food production.

The Hawaiin goby is diadromous. The adults live in fresh water where they also spawn. The eggs and embryos float down the stream into the sea where they eventually reach the juvenile stage. The juveniles then return to the fresh water streams to become adults. L. concolor is notable for its unusual method of returning to the spawning beds (something they however share with a few other gobies, including another Hawaiian species, Sicyopterus stimpsoni); they use suction disks on their ventral sides to climb the wet rocks behind waterfalls, even scaling the  Akaka Falls.

References

Hawaiian freshwater goby
Fish of Hawaii
Freshwater fish of Hawaii
Endemic fauna of Hawaii
Taxonomy articles created by Polbot
Fish described in 1860